The Robert-Bosch-Hospital (RBK) is a charitable hospital in Stuttgart, Germany, which was founded by Robert Bosch in 1936.

Robert Bosch fulfilled a long-cherished wish in 1936 on the occasion of his 75th birthday and the 50th jubilee of his company: he donated a hospital to the city of Stuttgart.

The Original hospital with its 360 beds opened in April 1940 and was replaced by a new building at a near-by location in 1973.

The hospital is supported by the Robert Bosch Stiftung (Robert Bosch Foundation). The Foundation and the managing board of the Hospital determine the strategic development of the medical, therapeutic and nursing care. The Foundation enables medical research and funds necessary investments which are not met from other sources. The Foundation guarantees that Robert Bosch's objective of high quality care for patients is realised in his hospital. Since 1978, the Robert-Bosch-Hospital has been part of the teaching hospital of the University of Tübingen.

The Robert-Bosch-Hospital, including Schillerhöhe and gynaecological hospital Charlottenhaus since January, 2006, disposes of more than 771 beds for acute care, 100 beds for geriatric rehabilitation, including 20 therapy places in day hospital, and 15 therapy places in the psychosomatic day hospital. The Robert-Bosch-Hospital admits approximately 32,000 in-patients a year.

The centres for internal, operational and diagnostic medicine are part of the hospital as well as a centre for pneumology and thorax surgery. Besides research institutes in clinical pharmacology and history of medicine, other institutions such as an interdisciplinary centre of tumour therapy, a breast centre, a school of nursing and centres for further education are associated with the hospital.

The Rems-Murr-hospitals and the Furtbach-hospital are co-operative partners of the Robert-Bosch-Hospital.

Notes

Hospitals in Germany
Hospital buildings completed in 1940
Hospital buildings completed in 1973
Buildings and structures in Stuttgart
Charitable hospitals
Medical and health organisations based in Baden-Württemberg